Bath, Virginia may refer to:

Bath (Berkeley Springs), West Virginia, before 1861
Bath County, Virginia